was a Japanese engraver and print maker trained in the Shin-Hanga and Sōsaku-Hanga styles of woodblock printing.

Kasamatsu was born in Tokyo in 1898 and apprenticed at the age of 13 to Kaburagi Kiyokata (1878–1973), a traditional master of Bijin-ga, pictures of beautiful women. Kasamatsu however took an interest in landscape and was given the pseudonym Shiro by his teacher, which he used as a signature mark in his prints. Kasamatsu made woodblock prints for the publisher Shōzaburō Watanabe from 1919. Almost all the woodblocks were destroyed in a fire in Watanabe's print shop following the Great Kanto Earthquake of 1923. Around 50 prints were published by Watanabe by the late 1940s. Kasamatsu began to partner with Unsodo in Kyoto from the 1950s and produced nearly 102 prints by 1960. He also began to print and publish on his own in the Sōsaku-Hanga style. He produced nearly 80 Sōsaku-Hanga prints between 1955 and 1965.

References

External links 
 The Lavenberg Collection of Japanese Prints
 Print collections -  

1898 births
1991 deaths
Japanese engravers
Japanese wood engravers
Japanese printmakers
Shin hanga artists
20th-century engravers